James Angus Dodds (7 September 1914 – 26 January 1942) was a Northern Irish professional footballer who played as a winger in the Football League for Fulham and Gillingham.

Personal life
Dodds served as a flight sergeant in the Royal Air Force Volunteer Reserve during the Second World War. He was mentioned in despatches twice during his service. Dodds was killed on 26 January 1942 aboard Lockheed Hudson AE602 when it was shot down by Japanese Ki-27 fighters during the Battle of Singapore. The bomber had been returning to base after conducting a raid on Japanese ships landing at Endau. Dodds is commemorated on the Kranji War Memorial.

Career statistics

References

1914 births
1942 deaths
Association footballers from Belfast
Association football wingers
Association footballers from Northern Ireland
English Football League players
Linfield F.C. players
Fulham F.C. players
Gillingham F.C. players
Glentoran F.C. players
Worcester City F.C. players
Kidderminster Harriers F.C. players
Royal Air Force Volunteer Reserve personnel of World War II
Royal Air Force airmen
Royal Air Force personnel killed in World War II
Aviators killed by being shot down
Military personnel from Belfast